Gloria Guida (born 19 November 1952) is an Italian actress and model. She is best known for starring in commedia erotica all'italiana, particularly the La liceale series, and also in erotic coming-of-age-drama films in the mid-1970s.

Life and career
Gloria Guida was born in Merano, Trentino-Alto Adige, to a family from Emilia Romagna. She moved with her family to Bologna as a child. She first began a singing career, starting in her father's dancing place on the Romagna coast. Then she took up modeling, becoming Miss Teenage Italia in 1974.

Guida subsequently went on to star in many sexy comedies. Two of her early films, La ragazzina (Monika in English-language release) and La minorenne, both shot in the summer of 1974, are stories of young female characters discovering their sexuality. She made her real breakthrough in 1975 with La liceale (Teasers). Another film of particular success was Avere vent'anni ("To Be Twenty") in 1978, where she starred with Lilli Carati.

She considers herself Roman Catholic.

Partial filmography

Monika (1974) – Monica
La minorenne (1974) – Valeria Sanna
La novizia (1975) – Maria, Sister Immacolata
So Young, So Lovely, So Vicious... (1975) - Angela Batrucchi
La liceale (1975) – Loredana
Il gatto mammone (1975) – Marietta
That Malicious Age (1975) – Paola
Il solco di pesca (1975) - Tonina
Blue Jeans (1975) – Daniela 'Blue Jeans' Anselmi
Scandalo in famiglia (1976) – Elena
Ragazza alla pari (1976) – Domenica Schlutzer
Il medico... la studentessa (1976) – Claudia Raselli
Maschio latino... cercasi (1977) – Gigia (segment "Stanotte o mai più")
 (1977) – Tarpeia
The Bermuda Triangle (1978) – Michelle
Being Twenty (1978) – Lia
La liceale nella classe dei ripetenti (1978) – Angela
The Perfect Crime (1978) – Polly
Travolto dagli affetti familiari (1978) – Eliana
Night Nurse (1979) – Angela Della Torre
How to Seduce Your Teacher (1979) – Angela Mancinelli
La liceale, il diavolo e l'acquasanta (1979) – Luna
L'affittacamere (1979) – Giorgia Mainardi
Fico d'India (1980) – Lia Millozzi
Bollenti spiriti (1981) – Marta Sartori
La casa stregata (1982) – Candida
Sesso e volentieri (1982)
 (1988, TV Mini-Series) – Linda / Wife of Luca / Susanna / Luisella / Armanda / Susy
Fratelli Benvenuti (2010, TV Series) – Doris (final appearance)

Discography
Singles
 1972 – L'uomo alla donna non può dire no/Pioggia nell'anima (CBS, CBS-8015)
 1972 – Cuore, fatti onore/Pioggia nell'anima (CBS, CBS-8375)
 1979 – La musica è/Gloria around the clock (CAM, AMP-219)

References

Sources

External links 

 

1955 births
Living people
People from Merano
Italian film actresses
Italian female models
20th-century Italian actresses
Italian women singers
Italian Roman Catholics